Penguin Bight is a bight on the southeast coast of Seymour Island, northward of Penguin Point. The feature was named "Pinguinbucht" (Penguin Bay) from the large penguin rookery observed there by the Swedish Antarctic Expedition, 1901–04. The term bight is considered appropriate for this feature.

Bays of the James Ross Island group
Bights (geography)